Dustin Sheppard (born September 23, 1980 in New Brunswick, New Jersey) is an American retired professional soccer player.

Raised in Hillsborough Township, New Jersey, Shepard attended Hillsborough High School.

Playing career 
Sheppard was signed to a developmental contract with MetroStars after graduating from Rutgers University.

Statistics

References

External links 
 Profile on MetroFanatic
 

1980 births
Living people
American soccer players
Association football forwards
Hillsborough High School (New Jersey) alumni
Major League Soccer players
New York Red Bulls players
People from Hillsborough Township, New Jersey
Rutgers Scarlet Knights men's soccer players
Soccer players from New Jersey
Sportspeople from New Brunswick, New Jersey
Sportspeople from Somerset County, New Jersey